Raudberg in the Norwegian language means Red Mountain. Three terrain features in East Antarctica bear the name Raudberg:
Raudberg Pass
Raudberg Valley
Raudberget

Raudberg Pass
Raudberg Pass is a pass between Kulen Mountain and Raudberget in the Borg Massif of Queen Maud Land.  Mapped by Norwegian cartographers from surveys and air photos by Norwegian-British-Swedish Antarctic Expedition (NBSAE) (1949–1952) and named for its proximity to Raudberget.

Raudberg Valley
Mapped by Norwegian cartographers from surveys and air photos by Norwegian-British-Swedish Antarctic Expedition (NBSAE) (1949–52) and named for its proximity to Raudberget.

Dalsnuten Peak is a peak rising above the ice in the northeast part of Raudberg Valley.

Raudberget
Raudberget is a prominent mountain just northeast of Hogskavlen Mountain in the Borg Massif of Queen Maud Land.  Mapped by Norwegian cartographers from surveys and air photos by Norwegian-British-Swedish Antarctic Expedition (NBSAE) (1949–52) and named Raudberget (the red mountain).

References

External links 
 United States Geological Survey, Geographic Names Information System (GNIS)
 Scientific Committee on Antarctic Research (SCAR)

Princess Martha Coast
Valleys of Queen Maud Land
Mountains of Queen Maud Land
Mountain passes of Queen Maud Land